Jonny Pelham is a British comedian and writer.

References

1990s births
Living people
British comedians